Molecular promiscuity indicates the ability of a molecule to bind to interact with one or more other classes and subtypes of molecules, in synergistic or antagonistic ways. These interactions may involve multiple paracrine, endocrine and autocrine features.

References
 

Chemical reactions